Sister M. Cyril Mooney, IBVM (born 21 July 1936) is an internationally recognized educational innovator and the 2007 winner of the Padma Shri Award, the Government of India's fourth-highest civilian honor. She is a native of Ireland and a Sister of the Institute of the Blessed Virgin Mary (Loreto). Since 1956 she has been living and working in India, where she has emerged as a nationwide leader in bringing quality education to urban and rural poor children.

Background
Professed Sister of the Institute of the Blessed Virgin Mary (1955)
Arrived in India on 10 October 1956
PhD in Zoology (Lucknow, Uttar Pradesh, India)
Principal of Loreto Day School Sealdah (Kolkata, India) since 1979

Civic honors/awards
2015: Saint Michael's College Honorary Doctor of Humane Letters 
2013: Irish Presidential Distinguished Service Award
2012: Aparajita award from Rupashi Bangla (Public Choice)
2011: Monmouth University's Global Visionary Award
2007: Padma Shri Award, the fourth highest civilian honor granted by the Indian government 
2002: International Christian Stewardship Award, Bishops of America.
2000: The Kolkata Telegraph Award for Creative Excellence
1994: The NOMA Award for Spreading Literacy, UNESCO
The Kolkata Telegraph Award for Social Service (7 times)
Friend of Child In Need Institute (CINI) Award
Woman of the Year, Ladies' Study Circle

Projects and major accomplishments
Loreto Day School - Sealdah
 During her tenure as principal, Sister Cyril transformed this once exclusively upper class private school for girls into a model for equality-based educational change in India.
 At present, 721 of the 1500 girls in attendance come from poor families (from slums and villages all over West Bengal) unable to pay school fees. The remaining 779 girls pay their full fees to attend.  Across caste, social class, neighborhood and otherwise, these 1500 girls make up a cohesive, cooperative, revolutionary student body.
 All Loreto students in Class V or higher also act as teachers in the Rainbow Program and Rural Child-to-Child Education Program (see below).

The Rainbow Program
 Sister Mooney's school houses, feeds, and educates nearly 250 formerly street-dwelling children, in addition to welcoming another 100 for special classes during the school day.  These residents, called "Rainbows", are, despite arriving with little or no school experience or literacy, integrated into mainstream classrooms as soon as possible. This is often in the children's mother tongues (Bengali or Hindi), but a substantial proportion of the Rainbow students are able to integrate into the English medium Loreto Day School itself.
This model has successfully been implemented at dozens of other schools across India, including all of the Loreto Schools in Kolkata.

Barefoot Teachers Training Program
 This program provides teacher training to young men and women from slums and villages near Kolkata who lack the basic requirements to be admitted to teachers' colleges.  Sister Cyril and her staff have trained over 7,000 teachers in this program, who in turn have brought primary education to over 350,000 village children with no access to education. The name "Barefoot Teachers" comes from the philosophy that one doesn’t need shoes to walk, but only feet.  The teachers in this program are given practical teaching skills (the feet) without the unnecessary (and irrelevant, in this case) addition of teaching theory (the shoe).

Shikshalaya Prakalpa
 This program, which may be understood as an expanded urban arm of the Barefoot Teachers Training Program, coordinates 470 teaching centres throughout Kolkata.  The teachers at these centres (some 1,400 at present) receive similar Barefoot Teaching training at the Loreto School in Sealdah before returning to the slums to teach children there who had no previous access to education. Thus far, over 26,000 children have benefited from this program. Shikshalaya Prakalpa also owns and operates a Mobile Library that transports educational reading materials to the slum teaching centres.

Hidden Domestic Child Labour Outreach
 This program, another arm of the Loreto Day School, combats the crisis of young children being put to work for their families or other slum employers rather than being sent to school.  Loreto students, under the guidance of Sister Cyril, actively seek out children and employers in these situations, and though various methods (i.e. talking with the children, badgering the employers, asking the children to "play" and then bringing them to school) take steps to reduce this trend.
 Loreto students have presented a traditional Indian dance drama which deals thematically with the issue of domestic child labour to over 50,000 other schoolchildren in Kolkata.

Rural Child-to-Child Education
 Every Thursday, Loreto students in Class V and above travel to villages outside of Kolkata to teach schoolchildren there whose class sizes are usually 120 pupils to one teacher or higher.  The program provides more intimate learning experiences for the rural students while simultaneously bringing the current struggles of rural education to the minds of the regular Loreto students.  These efforts reach over 3,500 students per week.

Other accomplishments
Sister Cyril and her staff have trained over 50 schools (both public and private) on the topic of Human Rights Education, in addition to succeeding in a proposal to form a West Bengal State Advisory Committee for the same issue.
The Loreto Day School also operates a class for children with special needs, with two full-time teachers for 30 students, some of whom are also part of the live-in Rainbow population.
Loreto Day School staff and resources have constructed five full-size secondary schools in rural and slum Kolkata, providing quality access to education for another 6,500 students.
Sister Mooney's school also offers a 24-hour "Childline" telephone service for street-dwelling children in distress. In addition to responding to nearly 100 calls for help, the Childline staff has made presentations about the project to a total audience of over 2,500 students and teachers.

See also
Education in India
Education in Kolkata

References

External links
Changemakers.net Article - "Sister Cyril's Army of Barefoot Teachers"
Changemakers.net Article - "Rainbow Children: Dissolving Differences"

Women educators from West Bengal
20th-century Indian educators
Heads of schools in India
Irish emigrants to India
Recipients of the Padma Shri in social work
1936 births
Living people
Women zoologists
Indian women philanthropists
Indian philanthropists
Women scientists from West Bengal
20th-century Indian zoologists
Scientists from Kolkata
Social workers
Educators from West Bengal
Social workers from West Bengal
20th-century women educators
20th-century Indian women